Johan Christian Collett (23 July 1817 – 29 April 1895) was a Norwegian politician.

Personal life
Johan Christian Collett was the son of Johan Collett (1775-1827), who was among the founders of the Norwegian Constitution, and Christiane Birgithe de Stockfleth (1782-1829). He had four brothers and six sisters, although three siblings died young. His brother  Peter Jonas Collett  was a prominent jurist and literary critic who  married Camilla Wergeland, and his sister Sophie Augusta married Peter Severin Steenstrup. He married his second cousin Johanne Christiane Collett (1822-1914). The couple had two daughters.

Career
He was County Governor of Kristians amt (today named Oppland) from 1854 to 1859 and of Akershus amt from 1859 to 1895.
He was acting Minister of the Interior in 1861, temporarily appointed councillor of state in interim 1881, and acting Minister of Auditing in 1884.

He was awarded the Order of St. Olav in 1892.

See also
Collett family

References

Norwegian people of English descent
Johan Christian
1817 births
1895 deaths
County governors of Norway
Government ministers of Norway